Dirk Nak (1884 or 1885 – 2 May 1967) was a Dutch trade union leader, active in Denmark.

Born in the Netherlands, Nak became a cigar maker.  In 1913, he moved to Denmark, where he carried on in the same trade, joining the Danish Tobacco Workers' Union.  In 1917, he was elected to the union executive, and in 1938, he was elected as president of the union, also serving on the executive of the Danish Confederation of Trade Unions, and as president of the International Federation of Tobacco Workers.  He stood down from the international in 1952, but held the other positions until his retirement in 1955.  He was also active in the Social Democrats, and from 1945 to 1958 sat on the Copenhagen City Council.

References

1880s births
1967 deaths
Dutch emigrants to Denmark
Dutch trade unionists
Social Democrats (Denmark) politicians
20th-century Copenhagen City Council members
Dutch trade union leaders